Province House may refer to:

 Province House (Nova Scotia) in Halifax, Nova Scotia, which houses the Nova Scotia House of Assembly
 Province House (Prince Edward Island) in Charlottetown, Prince Edward Island, which houses the Legislative Assembly of Prince Edward Island
 Province House (Boston, Massachusetts), residence of colonial governors of the Province of Massachusetts Bay